Thomas Trenchard is a football coach.

Thomas Trenchard may also refer to:

Thomas Trenchard (Dorset MP) (1582–1657), English MP for Dorset, 1621, 1645
Thomas Trenchard (died 1671), English MP for Poole
Thomas Trenchard (1672–1703), English MP for Dorchester
Thomas Trenchard, 2nd Viscount Trenchard (1923–1987), British peer and politician
Thomas Whitaker Trenchard (1863–1942), American lawyer and justice of the New Jersey Supreme Court